The 2008–09 Sheffield Shield season was the 107th season of official first-class domestic cricket in Australia. After nine seasons of being named the Pura Cup, it was announced that the Australian interstate trophy would return to its previous name of the Sheffield Shield as part of a new sponsorship agreement with Weet-Bix. The season began on 10 October 2008 when Queensland took on Tasmania at the Gabba. The two points table leaders at the end of the regular season, Victoria and Queensland, played each other in the final at the Junction Oval, with Victoria becoming Sheffield Shield champions after a drawn match thanks to their superior results in the regular season.

Table

Teams

Fixtures and results

Round 1

Round 2

Round 3

Round 4

Round 5

Round 6

Round 7

Round 8

Round 9

Round 10

Final

Statistics

Most Runs

Most Wickets

See also
 2008–09 Australian cricket season

References

Sheffield Shield
Sheffield Shield
Sheffield Shield seasons